is a Japanese football player. He is currently playing for FK Mash'al Mubarek in the Uzbek League.

References

External links

1990 births
Living people
Tokoha University alumni
Association football people from Saitama Prefecture
Japanese footballers
J2 League players
J3 League players
Japan Football League players
Kataller Toyama players
Honda FC players
Expatriate footballers in Cambodia
Association football forwards
Angkor Tiger FC players
Japanese expatriate sportspeople in Cambodia